Dhand is a Tulu film directed by Ranjith Bajpe and produced by Shodhan Prasad under the banner of Sandhya Creations. It stars Arjun Kapikad, Sandeep Shetty, Anoop Sagar, Deepak Paladka, Gopinath Bhat, Umesh Mijar, Ranjan Boloor, Shilpa Suvarna, Anvitha Sagar, and Subhash Bangera in the lead roles.

This is the first Tulu movie to be released in Australia, United Kingdom. and Israel

Synopsis 
Inspired by actual events, Dhand is an account of one man's heroism in a battle against evil and injustice that antagonizes his loved ones.

Cast
 Arjun Kapikad
 Sandeep Shetty
 Anoop Sagar
 Deepak Paladka
 Gopinath Bhat
 Pradeep Chandra Kuthpadi
 Umesh Mijar
 Ranjan Boloor
 Subhash Bangera
 Shilpa Suvarna
 Anvitha Sagar
 Nidhi Maroli
 Manju Rai Muloor
 Sudhakar Kudroli
 Shwetha Surathkal
 Riya Palekar
 Sundeep Malani (Guest Appearance)
 Shodhan Prasad
 Ameeta Kulal (Special Appearance)
 Lakshman Mallur
 Mack Matrai
 Shwetha Surathkal
 Varsha Karanth
 Parvathi Sasihitlu
 Sowmya
 ShashiKumar Tadambail
 Manohar Surathkal
 Charan
 Chethak

Production
Dhand is the second film released by Sandhya Creations. Following his success with Nirel, Ranjith Bajpe was chosen to direct. Early on in the project, Sudhakar Kudroli was appointed as executive producer. The lead role was assigned to Arjun Kapikad, and Sandeep Shetty, who had met Ranjith in Dubai when he attended the Bale Telipale program, was also brought on board. Deepak Paladka, winner of the "Bale Telipale" reality TV show in Dubai, was chosen for a key role in the movie. Other stars, notably Shilpa Suvarna, Anvitha Sagar, and Nidhi Maroli, were selected following auditions in Mangalore. Dhand has three female characters, whose costumes were a major consideration. Surakshitha Shetty was appointed costume designer, becoming the first female in the Tulu film industry to take on that role. Deepak Paladka was subsequently appointed to market the movie.

Filming got under way at Sri Sharavu Maha Ganapati Temple, Mangalore, on 14 January 2015, and took 37 days. On-site editing was performed by Sujith Nayak, and the dialogue editing took a total of 30 days to complete.

The romantic "Nina Teliken," sung by Sonu Nigam, was filmed over fours days at various scenic locations in and around Mangalore. The filming sought to encapsulate three aspects of Mother Nature: greenery, water, and drought. Director Ranjith Bajpe, working with Anoop Sagar and Surakshitha Shetty, choreographed the song. A wedding song, "Ora Oppi Bokka," was shot at night in a traditional house near Yekkar, Mangalore. It features Sandeep Shetty and Anvitha Sagar and was choreographed by Akul N. The introductory song, "Hero Yaanavodu," featuring Arjun Kapikad, was shot near Panambur and was also choreographed by Akul N. The sensuous song "Gammathu," featuring Anoop Sagar and Ameeta Kulal, was filmed at night at the Red Rock Resort near Surathkal Mangalore.

All of Dhand's action scenes were directed by Sandalwood stunt master Ultimate Shivu, who was also responsible for the stunt work in Ugramm.

Soundtrack
The film's soundtrack is by Abhishek S N, a software engineer from Bangalore, who composed music for another Tulu film, Nire.  He was assisted by Swapnil H Digde, who served as the arranger. "Ninna Teliken", the romantic song performed by Sonu Nigam, was penned by Loku Kudla, who also wrote the lyrics for "Gammathu," sung by Akanksha Badami. The wedding song "Ora Oppi Bokka," sung by Anoop Sankar and Pushpanjali Suchi, was penned by Rajneesh Amin, composer of the movie's touching track, "Mounada Badke Boda."  UY Ravichandran Sonadoor composed the lyrics for the introductory song "Hero Yaanavodu." Abhishek S N performed both "Mounada Badke Boda" and "Hero Yaanavodu."

List of Tulu Movies Links
List of Tulu films of 2015
List of Tulu films of 2014
List of Released Tulu films
Tulu Cinema
 Tulu Movie Actors
 Tulu Movie Actresses
Karnataka State Film Award for Best Regional Film
RED FM Tulu Film Awards
Tulu Cinemotsava 2015

References

External links
 
 

2015 films
2015 romantic comedy films
Tulu-language films
Films shot in Mangalore
Indian romantic comedy films